Norsey Wood is a  biological Site of Special Scientific Interest in Billericay, Essex. It is also a Local Nature Reserve and a Scheduled Monument.

The site is ancient oak woodland on acid soil which has been converted to mixed sweet chestnut coppice. Bluebell, bracken and bramble are dominant on the ground layer, but there are sphagnum mosses (sphagnum palustre and Sphagnum cuspidatum) in acidic flushes, and the rare water violet in one of the four ponds. There are nine species of dragonfly. Archaeolocal features include a Bronze Age bowl barrow, Iron Age and Roman cemeteries, and a medieval deer bank.

Norsey Wood is the likely site of the Battle of Billericay during the Peasants' Revolt of 1381, a battle the peasants lost.

There is a Forest nursery school based on the outside of the woods with access to the woods for the children, toilets, a car park and a trail. There is access from Outwood Common Road, Break Egg 
Hill, Norsey Close, Deerbank and Norsey Road.

References

External links
The Norsey Wood Society

Sites of Special Scientific Interest in Essex
Scheduled monuments in Essex
Local Nature Reserves in Essex
Billericay